Alexander Watson may refer to:
Alexander Watson (cricketer, born 1844) (1844–1920), English cricketer
Alexander Watson (cricketer, born 1945), English cricketer
Alexander Watson (diplomat) (born 1939), American ambassador and diplomat
Alexander Watson (historian) (born 1979), British historian, writer, and professor
Alexander Watson Hutton (1853–1936), Scottish teacher and sportsman
Alexander Wayne Watson (born 1969), American serial killer

See also
Alex Watson (disambiguation)